The Grimmrobe Demos is Sunn O)))'s first recorded album and is the most direct representation of its self-proclaimed Earth-worship. It was originally limited to 500 copies by Hydra Head Records but, in 2005, Southern Lord Records reissued it on CD and vinyl with a bonus live track. An early rehearsal track titled "Bremerton" was included on the vinyl release.

The album's third track was named after frontman Dylan Carlson of the band Earth and is a loose interpretation of the track "Ouroboros is Broken" from Earth's first release, Extra-Capsular Extraction.

The booklet of the second version of the album contains a long passage of apocalyptic writing by Seldon Hunt, written in Melbourne, Australia, during October 2004.

On August 8, 2008, Sunn O))) announced that it would do a mini-tour consisting of four concerts to commemorate the tenth anniversary of the album's release.

Track listing

References

1999 debut albums
Sunn O))) albums
Hydra Head Records albums
Southern Lord Records albums
Demo albums